Named for Newton E. Noyes, the Noyes Building is the administrative building on the Snow College campus, which is located in Ephraim, Utah.  It houses both the administrative offices and the mathematics department.  The money to build the Noyes building was entirely earned by the Ephraim community through the sale of their "Sunday eggs," the eggs their chickens laid on Sundays. The building has been listed as Snow Academy Building on the National Register of Historic Places since November 20, 1987.  It was designed by Richard C. Watkins.

It is a two-story brick and stone building which was built during 1899 to 1908.  It is primarily Classical Revival in style.

References

External links

School buildings completed in 1908
Buildings and structures in Sanpete County, Utah
University and college buildings on the National Register of Historic Places in Utah
Neoclassical architecture in Utah
Snow College
National Register of Historic Places in Sanpete County, Utah
1908 establishments in Utah